Amelia Lewsham or Amelia Harlequin or Amelia Newsham (c. 1748 – after 1797) was a Jamaican women born with albinism, enslaved and exhibited as the "White Negress" in London, and subjected to medical and naturalists examination. She freed herself and became eventually a businesswomen successfully making exhibitions by her own.

Life
Lewsham was born circa 1748, in Jamaica, probably Spanish Town where her mother worked as her owner's house servant. Both of her parents were black and she was born an albino. Lewsham was the property of Sir Simon Clarke 6th baronet who was so intrigued with her that he sent Lewshem, then about five years old, to England in 1753 as a present to his second son Kingsmill Clarke, a barrister of the Inner Temple. Clarke agreed to sell the girl after initially asking for 400 guineas.

Her new owner, Burnet, ran a shop in London and he toured the country with Lewsham, charging customers a shilling to see the unusual girl. Burnet showed her to both the Royal Society and the Royal Family and whilst touring she was baptised "Amelia Harleguin" in April 1766. Empowered by the baptism Lewsham left her owner and began exhibiting herself. Amelia married and had six children with a man named Lewsham or Newsham.

Eleven years later she was seen by Olaudah Equiano in London. In 1795 she was being exhibited by Thomas Hall in Finsbury Square and possibly at Bartholomew Fair. Souvenir coins were minted by W. Lutwtyche of Birmingham. One side of the coin showed Lewsham with message "MRS. NEWSHAM THE WHITE NEGRESS". The obverse said "The First Artist in Europe for Preserving Birds Beasts" and "T.Hall Citty Road near Finsbury Square London 1795" An Alternate obverse recorded that Thomas Hall was exhibiting Amelia at the "Curiosity House" on City Road.

She married with Mr Lewsham or Newsham, and English man, and had at least six children. Lewsham probably died in the UK but the date is not known.

References

1740s births
18th-century deaths

Year of birth uncertain
Year of death unknown
Jamaican women
People with albinism